The Philip Sweed House, in Petaluma, California, is a Queen Anne-style house built in 1892.  It has sometimes, mistakenly, been reported as the "Philip Swede House." 

The house is located at the intersection of Keokuk and Prospect Streets. It was listed on the National Register of Historic Places in 1992.

Sweed, though of limited formal education himself, was a champion of public education and served on the city's Board of Education from 1893 to 1925.

References

		
National Register of Historic Places in Sonoma County, California
Houses completed in 1892